The Chiffons were an American girl group originating from the Bronx, a borough of New York City, in 1960.

History

Origins
The group was originally a trio of schoolmates: Judy Craig, Patricia Bennett and Barbara Lee; at James Monroe High School in the Bronx in 1960. In 1962, at the suggestion of songwriter Ronnie Mack, the group added Sylvia Peterson, who had sung with Little Jimmy & the Tops at age 14, sharing lead vocals with Jimmy on "Say You Love Me", the B-side of the Tops' 1959 local hit "Puppy Love".

Recordings
The group was named the Chiffons when recording and releasing their first single, "He's So Fine", written by Ronnie Mack, produced by The Tokens of "The Lion Sleeps Tonight" fame, and released on the Laurie Records label. "He's So Fine" hit No. 1 in the United States, selling over one million copies, and was awarded a gold disc. (This sales figure would have qualified the record for platinum status under the current [as of 2011] RIAA certification standards, effective since 1975, that lowered the "gold" certification threshold to 500,000 copies and set the "platinum" threshold at 1 million.)

The Chiffons immediately released their first LP He's So Fine (which charted at No. 97) and began a round of touring around the US. Within a few months, the group released their second LP, One Fine Day.

The group also released two singles in 1963 as the Four Pennies (with Sylvia on lead) on the Laurie Records subsidiary Rust, but they abandoned the Four Pennies name as the success of "He's So Fine" became clear. This first hit was followed by other notable tunes such as Gerry Goffin and Carole King's "One Fine Day", "Sweet Talkin' Guy" and "I Have A Boyfriend". As the 1960s progressed, Peterson assumed a more prominent role in the group, singing lead on the Chiffons' "Why Am I So Shy", "Strange, Strange Feeling", "The Real Thing", "Up On The Bridge" and "My Block" (written by Jimmy Radcliffe, Carl Spencer and Bert Berns).

Shortly after the first round of hits, the Chiffons had business problems but still continued to tour the US throughout 1964 (including Murray the K Shows and as part of a package tour headlined by Gene Pitney). In mid-1965, they signed directly to the Laurie label, and had a hit with "Nobody Knows What's Going On In My Mind But Me". To promote the record, Sylvia and Barbara flew to the West Coast to premiere the disc on a July 1965 Shindig episode, with two substitute members as Judy and Pat were on maternity leave.

The next Top 10 hit for the Chiffons was "Sweet-Talking Guy" in mid 1966 which allowed the quartet to tour England and Germany for the first time; on one of their London club dates, members of the Beatles and Stones were in the audience. Several minor hits followed up to 1968.

Personnel changes
Tiring of the constant touring and lack of hits, Judy Craig left the group before 1970 and took a bank job in Manhattan. The remaining trio continued to do live shows with Sylvia now as permanent lead singer. Eventually, Sylvia, Pat, and Barbara took on regular 9-5 jobs, but continued to do live shows on weekends. Sylvia eventually left, and her spot was taken by alternating friends of the group.

In 1970, George Harrison released the song "My Sweet Lord", whose musical similarities to "He's So Fine" prompted the estate of Ronnie Mack to file a copyright infringement claim. The Chiffons went on to record "My Sweet Lord" in 1975. A judge later found that Harrison had unintentionally plagiarized the earlier song.

Sylvia returned to the Chiffons during the 1980s. On May 15, 1992, Barbara Lee died from a heart attack, and Craig returned to the group. Peterson retired shortly thereafter and was replaced by Connie Harvey. Harvey has since left to pursue a solo career and Bennett has retired from the group.

Discography

The Four Pennies
Singles
1963 "My Block" (Jimmy Radcliffe - Carl Spencer - Bert Berns) (US #67)
1963 "When the Boy's Happy" (US #95)

The Chiffons
Standard albums

1963: He's So Fine Laurie Records – LLP 2018 (US #97)
"He's So Fine"
"Will You Still Love Me Tomorrow"
"Oh My Lover"
"Why Do Fools Fall in Love"
"My Block"
"ABC-123"
"Lucky Me"
"Why Am I So Shy"
"See You in September"
"Wishing"
"Mystic Voice"
"When I Go to Sleep at Night"

1963: One Fine Day Laurie Records – LLP 2020
"One Fine Day"
"It's My Party"
"The Loco-Motion"
"Tonight I Met an Angel"
"Only My Friend"
"Da Doo Ron Ron"
"I Wonder Why”
"Foolish Little Girl"
"I'm Going to Dry My Eyes"
"Did You Ever Go Steady"
"When Summer's Through"
"Love Is Like a Merry Go Round"
"My Boyfriend's Back"

1966: Sweet Talkin' Guy Laurie Records – SLP 2036 (US #149)
"Sweet Talkin' Guy"
"Up On the Bridge"
"Nobody Knows What's Going On"
"Thumbs Down"
"Just a Boy"
"Down Down Down"
"Out of This World"
"My Boyfriend's Back"
"Open Your Eyes"
"March"
"Keep the Boy Happy"
"See You in September"

1970: My Secret Love B.T. Puppy Records – BTPS-1011 
"Secret Love"
"You're The Love Of A Lifetime"
"Soul"
"I Don't Deserve A Boy Like You"
"Strange Strange Feeling"
"Now That You're My Baby"
"The First And Last"
"Remember Me Baby"
"It Hurts To Be Sixteen"
"Every Boy And Every Girl"

Compilation albums
1974: Everything You Always Wanted to Hear by the Chiffons but Couldn't Get
1979: The Chiffons Sing the Hits of the 50s & 60s
2004: Absolutely The Best!
2006: Sweet Talkin' Girls

Singles
1963: "He's So Fine"/"Oh My Lover" (US #1, UK #16)
1963: "Lucky Me"/"Why Am I So Shy"
1963: "One Fine Day"/"Why Am I So Shy" (US #5, UK #29)
1963: "A Love So Fine"/"Only My Friend" (US #40)
1963: "I Have a Boyfriend"/"I'm Gonna Dry My Eyes" (US #36)
1964: "Sailor Boy"/"When the Summer Is Through" (US #81)
1964: "Easy to Love"/"Tonight I Met an Angel"
1964: "What Am I Gonna Do With You (Hey Baby)"/"Strange, Strange Feeling"
1965: "Nobody Knows What's Goin' On (In My Mind but Me)"/"Did You Ever Go Steady" (US #49)
1965: "Nobody Knows What's Goin' On (In My Mind but Me)"/"The Real Thing"
1965: "Tonight I'm Gonna Dream"/"Heavenly Place"
1966: "Out of This World"/"Just a Boy" (US #67)
1966: "Stop, Look and Listen"/"March" (US #85)
1966: "Sweet Talkin' Guy"/"Did You Ever Go Steady" (US #10, UK #31) (UK #4 (1972 re-issue))
1966: "My Boyfriend's Back"/"I Got Plenty of Nuttin'"
1967: "If I Knew Then"/"Keep the Boy Happy"
1968: "Up on the Bridge"/"March"
1968: "Just for Tonight"/"Teach Me How"
1969: "Love Me Like You're Gonna Lose Me"/"Three Dips of Ice Cream"
1970: "So Much in Love"/"Strange Strange Feeling"
1975: "My Sweet Lord"/"Main Nerve"
1976: "Dream Dream Dream"/"Oh My Lover"

In popular culture
 Chiffon is the name of one of the girl-group-inspired narrators in the musical Little Shop of Horrors.

References

Bibliography
Clemente, John (2000). Girl Groups - Fabulous Females That Rocked The World. Iola, Wisconsin. Krause Publications. p. 276. 
Clemente, John (2013). Girl Groups - Fabulous Females Who Rocked The World. Bloomington, Indiana Authorhouse Publications. p. 623.  (sc);  (e).

External links
Official Website
Last.FM- The Chiffons Page
Yahoo! Music- The Chiffons page

Musical groups established in 1960
African-American girl groups
Doo-wop groups
Laurie Records artists
1960 establishments in New York City
21st-century American women
Musical groups from the Bronx